How to be Cool is a 1987 novel written by Philip Pullman and intended for older teen readers.  The plot revolves around a young man named Jacob who finds out the truth about the sinister plans of the National Cool Board and hits upon an idea to beat them at their own game.

Release details
1987, UK Heinemann Young Books, Pub date 1 September 1987, hardback (First edition)
1987, UK Heinemann Young Books, Pub date 1 September 1987, paperback
Cover illustration & lettering: Martina Farrow

Television adaptation
It was adapted for television in the United Kingdom by Granada Television for ITV, and starred Roger Daltrey and Freddie Jones. Four 60-minute episodes aired between 3–17 December 1988.

References

1987 British novels
British young adult novels
Heinemann (publisher) books